Karl Ludwig von Bruck (Elberfeld, 8 October 1798 – Vienna, 23 April 1860) was an Austrian statesman.

Biography
In 1821 Bruck went to Trieste in order to take part in the War for Greek Independence, and, remaining there several years, founded the Trieste Lloyd (later Österreichischer Lloyd), a combination of insurance societies.

In 1848, he was a member of the Frankfurt Parliament. After the Vienna Revolution of October 1848, he became Minister of Commerce and Public Works. In this office, he introduced a number of reforms in the industrial policy of the government, established important telegraph lines, built a number of highways and railroads and founded the Austro-German Postal Union. In 1849 the Emperor gave him the rank of baron, but in 1851 he was compelled to resign his ministry.

In 1855, Bruck became Minister of Finance. He was not able to introduce the reforms he wished and when a period of general financial disaster resulted from the Italian war, Bruck was personally blamed. He accordingly obtained his dismissal from the Emperor and the next day committed suicide. He was officially declared innocent one month after his death.

Notes

References

1798 births
1860 deaths
Austrian Empire politicians
Members of the Frankfurt Parliament